Tatianyx is a genus of plants in the grass family. The only known species is Tatianyx arnacites, native to the States of Bahia, Goiás, Mato Grosso, Minas Gerais, and Pará.

References

Panicoideae
Endemic flora of Brazil
Monotypic Poaceae genera